Cassius "Cash" Levy is an American stand-up comedian, author, actor and podcaster.

Early life 

Cash was born in St. Louis, Missouri, and grew up in Palo Alto, California. He currently resides in Los Angeles, California with his wife and two children.

Professional career 

Cash works primarily as a stand up comedian. Cash created the improvised comedy podcast, "Cashing in with T.J. Miller" which he hosts with fellow comedian T.J. Miller. Cash was a contributing writer for the 2015 and 2016 Critics Choice Awards where he wrote jokes and sketches for the broadcast. Cash is known for his eponymous "Cash Phrases", a growing list of comical sayings he's coined on his podcast.

Television credits 

 @Midnight
 The Late Late Show with Craig Ferguson
 Comedy Central's Premium Blend
 Comics Unleashed with Byron Allen

Comedy recordings 
In 2012, he performed a one-hour stand-up special, "Cash Levy: Crowd Control" that aired on AXS TV. He'd previously released a comedy album entitled "Extemporaneous", which is an hour of completely improvised material.

References

External links
Cashing in with T.J. Miller podcasts
Cash Phrases
 

American stand-up comedians
Living people
Male actors from St. Louis
Year of birth missing (living people)
American podcasters
Comedians from Missouri